Ayumi Morita and Ai Sugiyama were the defending champions, but neither player chose to compete that year.

Kimiko Date-Krumm and Kurumi Nara won the title, defeating Melanie South and Nicole Thijssen 6–1, 6–7(8–10), [10–7] in the final.

Seeds

Draw

Draw

References
 Main Draw

2008 Doubles
Kangaroo Cup - Doubles
2008 in Japanese tennis